Trần Trọng Bình (born 24 September 1983) is a Vietnamese footballer who plays for Sanna Khánh Hòa BVN as a Defender (association football). He was called up to the Vietnam national football team in 2009.

References 

1983 births
Living people
Vietnamese footballers
Association football defenders
Vietnam international footballers
Xuan Thanh Saigon Cement FC players